Veronika Moos-Brochhagen (born April 3, 1961) is a German textile artist. She was born in Bensberg, Germany and lives and works in Cologne, Germany, and Audinghen, France. Moos-Brochhagen studied art at the Academy of Art in Mainz, Germany (class Prof. E. Knoche-Wendel), philosophy and German, also at the University of Mainz, Germany. In 2007, she did her dissertation/PhD ("Transparenz der Verhüllung - die Unschärfe der Wahrheit. Eine Studie zur Sinnlichkeit von textilem Material in der Kunst am Beispiel alter und neuer Hungertücher“) at the University of Cologne, Germany. Moos-Brochhagen works with or without textile materials. Often she uses a special kind of Shibori-technique. In each case her works are "textile" (The word textile is from Latin texere which means "to weave", "to braid", "to construct" or "to connect").

Exhibitions

Solo exhibitions (selection) 
 1990 Gallery Smend, Cologne, Germany
 1997 Maternushaus, Cologne, Germany
 2003 Gallery Stracke, Cologne, Germany
 2003 Gallery Unik:te, Pesch, Germany
 2004 Liverpool Biennale Liverpool, England
 2005 St. Maria im Kapitol, Cologne, Germany
 2005 Metropolitan Cathedral, Liverpool, England
 2007 Gallery Contrast, Tilburg, Netherlands
 2009 Textilmuseum “Die Scheune”, Nettetal, Germany
 2009 ”Fadensonnen” - Textile Zeichnungen und Objekte, Haslach, Austria
 2014 ”Au Bord De La Mer”, Côte de Lumiére, Salle Marcel Baudoin, Saint-Gilles-Croix-de-Vie, France

Participations (selection) 
 2000 "Made in Koeln", Gallery The View I, Liverpool, England
 2001 "Tu was Du willst", Museum Baden, Solingen, Schloss Hardenberg-Museum, Velbert, Germany
 2002 "Tactile Dimensions", London, Dublin, Harrogate, Great Britain, Ireland
 2002 "made in Cologne – found in Liverpool", Gallery The View II, Liverpool, England
 2002 "made in Cologne – found in Liverpool", Historical City Hall, Cologne, Germany
 2002 "Frau vor Ort". Trinitatiskirche, Cologne, Germany
 2002 Gallery Smend, Cologne, Germany
 2003 "Iceland´s Connections", Reykjavìk, Korpúlfsstaðuir u. Hofn Hornafjordur, Iceland
 2004 "Garantiert gebrauchsfrei", Niederrheinisches Museum, Kevelaer, Germany
 2004 "About accidental lines and redness spots", Hope Gallery, Liverpool, England
 2005 "Stille", Kloster Knechtsteden, Knechtsteden, Germany
 2005 "FormART 2005" Klaus Oschmann Preis, Stuttgart, Germany
 2005 "Textile Catalysts: Shibori shaping the 21st century" Tama Art Museum, Tokyo, Japan
 2006 "A… wie Altenberg", Kreishaus, Bergisch Gladbach, Germany
 2007 "100 Jahre Herding: Kunst – Visionen - Geschichte", Westfälisches Industriemuseum – Textilmuseum, Bocholt, Germany
 2008 "Fadenspiel und Sticheleien", Museum der Stadt, Bad Neuenahr-Ahrweiler, Germany
 2008 "Papier und Textil", Walkmühle, Wiesbaden, Germany
 2008 "Shibori, teintures à réserves", Galerie: La Soie Disante, Paris, France
 2008 "Shibori, hier et ajourd´hui (Shibori, yesterday and today)", Mairie du 5 Arrondissement (City Hall), Paris, France
 2009 “Textil als Material & Metapher, 6 Positionen”, International Exhibition (Curator, Conception), Bergisch Gladbach, Germany
 2009 ”GEDOK FormART 2009, Klaus Oschmann Preis”; Hannover, Germany
 2009/2010 “Le tissu dans tous ses sens", 2nd Biennale of Contemporary Art 2009/2nde biennale de créations textiles contemporaines, Musée des Tissus de Lyon, France
 2010 "Skulpturale Arbeiten in Textil und Metall", Museum Edenkoben, Edenkoben, Germany
 2011 "GesichtZeigen", Special Exhibition of "GEDOK" Cologne, Käthe-Kollwitz-Museum, Cologne, Germany
 2012 "Two of us", Quartier am Hafen, Cologne, Germany

Art projects and collaborations 
 "Belonging and Beyond", Collaboration with Lin Holland, Liverpool, England
 Art project "TX 5", Cologne
 Artproject "Made in Koeln", Cologne
 Artproject "eight-days-a-week", Cologne/Liverpool

Publications (selection)
 GEDOK KÖLN e. V., Hannelore Fischer (Hrg.): „GesichtZeigen“ - Positionen zeitgenössischer Künstlerinnen zum Portrait, Käthe-Kollwitz-Museum, Cologne, Germany 2011
 Moos-Brochhagen, Veronika: Das 7. Internationale Shibori-Symposium in Frankreich/ 7th International Shibori Symposium in France, Textilforum 1/2009, S. 14 -15
 Knoche-Wendel, Elfriede: „Papier/Textil 1987 – 2008“. Dokumentation der Examens- und Diplomarbeiten der letzten 21 Jahre, Klasse Knoche-Wendel. Mainz, Germany, 2008
 Moos-Brochhagen, Veronika (2008). Die Unschärfe der Wahrheit. Transparenz der Verhüllung. Eine Studie zur Sinnlichkeit von textilem Material in der Kunst am Beispiel    alter und neuer Hungertücher. PhD thesis, University of Cologne, Germany
 Moos-Brochhagen, Veronika: Das 6. Internationale Shibori-Symposium in Tokio/ 6th International Shibori Symposium, Tokyo. Textilforum 3/2005, S. 32-33”
 Moos-Brochhagen, Veronika, Holland, Lin: „Collaboration“, Liverpool Hope University, Cologne, Germany/ Liverpool, England 2003
 Moos-Brochhagen, Veronika: “4. Internationales Shibori-Symposium in Europa/4th International Shibori Symposium in Europe”, Textilforum 1/2003 March, S. 8/9
 Moos-Brochhagen, Veronika: “Konzepte Textiler Kunst“, Textil & Unterricht 4/2003, Kallmeyerische Verlagsbuchhandlung, S. 14-17
 Pohl, Walfried, Moos-Brochhagen, Veronika,"Textile Materialkunst von Veronika Moos-Brochhagen",  in: Textilkunst, Bd. 27 (1999), S. 176 - 179 : Ill.
 Moos-Brochhagen, Veronika: “Textilkunst: Ein- und Aussichten” in 25 Jahre Galerie Smend, 25 Jahre Textile Kunst. Verlag der Galerie Smend, Cologne, Germany 1998, S. 130-31

References

Further reading
 Privat-Savigny, Maria-Anne: „Le tissu dans tous ses sens“. Musée des Tissus de Lyon, Couleurs Contemporaines Bernard Chauveau (éditeur) Paris, France 2009, S. 22, 23, 31. 
 Ingrid Scheller (Hrg.): Klaus Oschmann Preis. Gedok FormArt. Hannover 2009, S. 46-47
 Takeda, Kozo: „Arimatsu Shibori“. with essay on Contemporary Shibori by Yoshiko Iwamoto Wada. Graphic-sha, Japan 2008, S. 149. 
 Cousin, Françoise / Chaudun, Nicolas: „Chemins de couleurs“. Musée du quai Branly, Paris, France 2008
 Tama Art University Museum, Tokyo (Hrg.): Shibori Textile Catalysts, Contemporary Fiber Art., 2005, S. 23
 Antje Soleau: “Belonging and Beyond”, Veronika Moos-Brochhagen zu ihrer Mantelinstallation, Textilkunst international, Heft 4, Dez. 2005, S. 174-176
 Freusberg/Göbel/Toyka-Fuong (Hrsg): “Frau vor Ort”, Cologne/Bonn 2002, 
 Dt. Werkbund Nordrhein-Westfalen (Hrsg): “Aus Hecken werden Häuser - Bauwerke als Baumwerke” Weltweites Projekt der EXPO 2000, Dokumentation, S. 21 und 26
 Grünke, Friderike: “Zeitgenössische Textilkunst im Wirkungsbereich Deutschland, Österreich, Schweiz” Verlag Brüder Hollinek, Wien 1993, S. 86
 Zeitgenössisches dt. Kunsthandwerk. Hrsg. Museum für Kunsthandwerk u. d. Landeshauptstadt Hannover und Kestner Museum, Prestel Verlag, München 1990, S. 342-343

External links 
 
 Shibori
 International project with Lin Holland, Liverpool, England

1961 births
Living people
Johannes Gutenberg University Mainz alumni
Women textile artists
German textile artists